David Dziobkowski is a brigadier general in the Wisconsin Air National Guard.

Career
Dzibokowski graduated from the United States Military Academy and served in the Gulf War as a member of the United States Army. He later earned a J.D. degree at William Mitchell College of Law as a civilian before joining the Wisconsin Air National Guard. Dzibkowski's positions have included serving as Judge Advocate General of the Wisconsin National Guard.

References

Military personnel from Madison, Wisconsin
Wisconsin National Guard personnel
National Guard (United States) generals
United States Army officers
Lawyers from Madison, Wisconsin
United States Military Academy alumni
Living people
1963 births